Amieira is a former civil parish in the municipality of Portel, Portugal. The population in 2011 was 362, in an area of 98.36 km2. On 28 January 2013, the parish merged with Alqueva to form the new parish of Amieira e Alqueva.

Population

References

Former parishes of Portel, Portugal